The  was the twelfth season of the Japan Football League, the third tier of the Japanese football league system.

Overview

At the end of the 2009 season, three new clubs were promoted from the Japanese Regional Leagues by virtue of their final placing in the Regional League promotion series:

Matsumoto Yamaga and Hitachi Tochigi Uva were promoted automatically.
Zweigen Kanazawa won the play-off series against FC Kariya.

Before the season corporate TDK SC were renamed to Blaublitz Akita and started operations as an independent football club. Hitachi Tochigi Uva S.C. has dropped the company prefix and changed its name to simply Tochigi Uva F.C.

Matsumoto Yamaga were approved as J. League associate members at the annual meeting in February. Zweigen Kanazawa applied for the membership later in April but the application was not accepted because of incomplete documentation.

Gainare Tottori are the first club to be promoted to J. League Division 2 as champions since Ehime FC in 2005 season.

Table

Results

Top scorers
{| class="wikitable"
|-
!Rank
!Scorer
!Club
!Goals
|-
! 1
| Sho Gokyu
|Sagawa Shiga
|align=center| 27
|-
! 2
| Masatoshi Matsuda
|Blaublitz Akita
|align=center| 24
|-
! 3
| Yoshinori Katsumata
|Machida Zelvia
|align=center| 18
|-
! 4
| Ryosuke Kijima
|Machida Zelvia
|align=center| 16
|-
!rowspan=2| 5
| Ryota Arimitsu
|V-Varen Nagasaki
|align=center| 13
|-
| Shunta Takahashi
|Tochigi Uva
|align=center| 13
|-
! 7
| Shintaro Hirai
|SP Kyoto
|align=center| 11
|-
!rowspan=4| 8
| Michiaki Kakimoto
|Matsumoto Yamaga
|align=center| 10
|-
| Hamed Koné
|Gainare Tottori
|align=center| 10
|-
| Junya Nitta
|Honda FC
|align=center| 10
|-
| Kodai Suzuki
|Honda FC
|align=center| 10
|-
|}

Attendance

Promotion and relegation
Due to Gainare Tottori being promoted to J2, the Regional League promotion series champions and runners-up, Kamatamare Sanuki and Nagano Parceiro, were promoted automatically. The third-placed Sanyo Electric Sumoto S.C. faced Arte Takasaki in the promotion and relegation series.

Arte Takasaki won the series 4–1 on aggregate and stayed in JFL.

References

2010
3